Vacuum-tube computers, now called  first-generation computers, are programmable digital computers using vacuum-tube logic circuitry. They were preceded by systems using electromechanical relays and followed by systems built from discrete transistors. Some later computers on the list had both vacuum tubes and transistors.

This list of vacuum-tube computers is sorted by date put into service:

See also
 List of transistorized computers
 History of computing hardware

References

Vacuum tube computers
 
Computers, list of vacuum tube